Tenis,  is a lake in the southern part of the West Siberian Plain, Omsk Oblast, south-central Russia.

The lake is an Important Bird Area, especially for the Dalmatian pelican, and is part of a  protected area. The name is probably from teŋiz, the Siberian Tatar word for "sea".

Geography
The waters of Tenis are fresh. The western section of the lake is also known as Saltaim. The Tenis-Saltaim lake is the largest of the Krutinka Lake group. The Ust-Logatka and Ust-Kiterna settlements of Krutinsky District are located by the lake. The Osha river flows across Tenis and minor rivers such as the Karasuk, Balka-Sukhaya and Tleutsay flow into it. The shores are generally low, they are marshy in some places. Very close to the north lies a cluster of smaller lakes, including Synkul, Kalykul, Sazykul, Gorkoye and Achikul.

Lake Ik, the second largest lake of the group, is located nearby to the southwest.

Fauna
Among the fish species found in the waters of the Tenis/Saltaim, crucian carp, pike, zander, perch, bream and carp are worth mentioning.

See also
List of lakes of Russia

References

External links
 Big Krutinka Lakes
Exponential Increase in the Abundance of the Dalmatian Pelican (Pelecanus crispus) in the Kurgan and Tyumen Regions
Omsk region: description, features, natural and animal world.

Bodies of water of Omsk Oblast
West Siberian Plain